Needilup is a town in the Great Southern region of Western Australia, situated between Ongerup and Jerramungup along the Gnowangerup-Jerramungup Road.

The establishment of a town arose after a local member petitioned the lands department for land to be made available for a townsite in 1951 after settlement in the area lead to a demand for land. Lots were surveyed soon afterward and the townsite was declared in 1954.

The name is Aboriginal in origin and the meaning is unknown. The name is taken from the nearby Needilup River that was first surveyed in 1901 and spelt in a variety of ways.

References 

Towns in Western Australia
Great Southern (Western Australia)